Kepa Arrizabalaga Revuelta (born 3 October 1994) is a Spanish professional footballer who plays as a goalkeeper for  club Chelsea. He is sometimes referred to simply as Kepa.

Arrizabalaga began his senior club career with Athletic Bilbao. He played for Basconia, and joined Ponferradina and Real Valladolid on consecutive loans, between 2011 and 2016. He then returned to Bilbao and became a first-team regular; in 2018, he was the subject of a record association football transfer when he moved to Chelsea in a transfer worth €80 million (£72 million), a record fee for a goalkeeper. There, he won the UEFA Europa League, the UEFA Champions League and the UEFA Super Cup.

Arrizabalaga won the 2012 European Championship with Spain's under-19 team. He made his senior debut in 2017, and was selected for the 2018 World Cup.

Club career

Athletic Bilbao
Born in Ondarroa, Biscay, Basque Country, Arrizabalaga joined Athletic Bilbao's youth setup at Lezama in 2004, aged ten. He made his senior debut with the farm team in January 2012, in Tercera División.

On 5 May 2012, Arrizabalaga was called up to the main squad for a La Liga match against Getafe CF, but remained unused in the 0–0 draw at the San Mamés Stadium. He was also called up to pre-season in July, and on 23 September was also a substitute in another home game of the same outcome, against Málaga CF.

Arrizabalaga was promoted to the reserves in January 2013, to cover for injured Jon Ander Serantes. He made his debut for the B-side on 16 February 2013, keeping a clean sheet in a 1–0 win over UD Logroñés in the Segunda División B. On 3 March, he was sent off towards the end of a 3–1 home win over SD Amorebieta, as was teammate Jon García; in April he suffered a pubalgia, only returning to the fields in September.

Arrizabalaga appeared regularly for the B's after his return, but broke the first metacarpal of his right hand in January 2014, being sidelined for a month. On 11 March, Getafe submitted a loan request to the Lions for him, as a replacement to injured Miguel Ángel Moyá, but it was rejected a day later.

On 5 January 2015, Arrizabalaga was loaned to Segunda División club SD Ponferradina until June. He made his professional debut on the 11th, starting in a 1–1 home draw against Racing de Santander.

On 20 July 2015, Arrizabalaga moved to Real Valladolid, also of the second tier, in a season-long loan deal. He played his first competitive game on 22 August, in a 0–1 loss at Córdoba CF, and missed only three matches as his team finished 16th.

After returning from loan, Arrizabalaga was included in the first team, initially as third-choice behind Gorka Iraizoz and Iago Herrerín. He made his debut in the top flight on 11 September 2016, starting in a 1–0 away win over Deportivo de La Coruña.

On 22 January 2018, amid heavy transfer speculation linking him to Real Madrid, Arrizabalaga renewed his contract – due to expire that June – until 2025.

Chelsea

2018–19: Debut season, UEFA Europa League victory

On 8 August 2018, Athletic Bilbao announced on their website that Arrizabalaga had paid his required release clause (€80 million / £71.6 million), making him the world's most expensive goalkeeper only weeks after the record was set by Alisson's transfer to Liverpool. Later that day, his move to Chelsea on a seven-year contract was confirmed, replacing Thibaut Courtois who departed for Real Madrid. He made his Premier League debut three days later in a 3–0 away win against Huddersfield Town, going on to keep six clean sheets in the team's 12-match unbeaten run in the league, before a 3–1 defeat at the hands of Tottenham Hotspur.

On 24 January 2019, in the second leg of the EFL Cup semi-final, Arrizabalaga saved a penalty from Tottenham's Lucas Moura in a 4–2 penalty shoot-out win at Stamford Bridge, helping his team go through to the final.

On 24 February 2019, during the 2019 EFL Cup Final against Manchester City, with the match at 0–0 near the end of extra time, Maurizio Sarri called for Arrizabalaga to be substituted off for Willy Caballero for the upcoming penalty shootout. Arrizabalaga refused to be substituted, gesticulating and remaining on the field. During the shootout, he saved one penalty as Chelsea lost 4–3. After the game, both Arrizabalaga and Sarri said that the situation was a misunderstanding, with Sarri incorrectly believing that Arrizabalaga was too injured with cramp to continue. Later on, Arrizabalaga met with Sarri and apologised to him and to the rest of the club. He was fined a week's worth of pay as a result of his actions, with Sarri leaving the decision of any further discipline up to the club. Arrizabalaga was dropped from the starting lineup for Caballero in Chelsea's next match, a Premier League game against Tottenham. He returned to the lineup for the following match.

On 9 May 2019, Arrizabalaga saved two penalties in the shootout at the end of the second leg of the UEFA Europa League semi-final against Eintracht Frankfurt to take Chelsea to the final, which they won 4–1 over Arsenal.

2019–21: Struggles, UEFA Champions League win
Under the management of Frank Lampard, Arrizabalaga and Chelsea failed to win any trophies. Throughout the season, Arrizabalaga struggled to stay in form, eventually being benched in favor of Willy Caballero in late January 2020 in a cup match against Hull City. Arrizabalaga was further not selected to the starting squad during the next four league matches and a Champions League match. He regained his starting spot on 4 March during the FA Cup fifth round against Liverpool where he made a string of saves to deny the would-be Premier League champions; Chelsea went on to win the match 2–0. But he would find himself benched to end the season, missing out on the team's run to the final of the FA Cup. During the second half of the season, Arrizabalaga faced abuse from Chelsea fans which led to him turning off comments on social media.

Arrizabalaga appeared for Chelsea in the opening game of the 2020–21 Premier League season against Brighton & Hove Albion. Chelsea won 3–1. Arrizabalaga was judged to have made a significant error in the next match against Liverpool, after his pass went straight to Sadio Mané who collected the ball and scored; Chelsea went on to lose 2–0. Lampard publicly criticized Arrizabalaga, stating that his mistake had cost a goal.

On 24 September, Chelsea signed Édouard Mendy from Stade Rennais and Arrizabalaga was relegated to the bench. He did not feature again until 17 October against Southampton where his performance received further criticism in the media as the side drew 3–3. On 10 January 2021, Arrizabalaga marked his 100th appearance for the club in a 4–0 home win against Morecambe in the fourth round of the FA Cup.

Arrizabalaga's fortunes turned under the coaching of Thomas Tuchel. He kept 5 clean sheets in 8 games, all of which came in successive games. He had a save percentage of 89.4% under the German manager, significantly higher than under the previous manager. He was named as part of the 25-man squad for the 2021 UEFA Champions League Final on 29 May, and was an unused substitute as Chelsea beat Manchester City 1–0 at the Estádio do Dragão, lifting his second European trophy.

2021–22: Super Cup win & EFL Cup final defeat

In the 2021 UEFA Super Cup against Villarreal, Arrizabalaga came on as a substitute in the 119th minute to replace first choice goalkeeper Mendy. He saved two penalties, including the decisive attempt from Villarreal captain Raúl Albiol, in the shootout as Chelsea won their second Super Cup title. The Spaniard got a start against Tottenham Hotspur, keeping a clean sheet. Later in the season, Arrizabalaga started only a few matches including league cup tie against Aston Villa, which Chelsea would go on to win 4–3 on penalties after a 1–1 draw. Arrizabalaga made a decisive save against a spot kick from Marvelous Nakamba, leading him to become Chelsea's most successful goalkeeper at saving penalties during shootouts, passing Petr Čech.

During January 2022, following Mendy’s departure to the AFCON, Arrizabalaga was reinstated to the first team. The Spaniard took his team to the final of the EFL Cup, notably thanks to his quick thinking to trap Harry Kane offside. He then went on to have another excellent performance in the Club World Cup semi final, as Chelsea went on to win the tournament. On 27 February, in the EFL Cup Final, Arrizabalaga came on in the 120th minute, ready for the penalty shootout. Despite this, he failed to save a single penalty and missed the only penalty of the shootout in an 11-10 defeat against Liverpool.

2022: Re-emergence under Graham Potter

In 2022, Chelsea replaced Tuchel with new manager Graham Potter, and also brought in new goalkeeping coach Ben Roberts. This coincided with Mendy, who was Tuchel's preferred goalkeeper, being injured and in poor form. Kepa contributed to a draw in Potter's first game with a save to deny Benjamin Šeško, but this was followed by a game cancelation and an international break. Kepa continued in the team in the next game against Crystal Palace, a 2–1 win. He kept his place in the squad with a run of five consecutive clean sheets, including impressive away displays at Aston Villa and Brentford, the latter of which being his 50th for Chelsea. After having gone 10 hours without conceding, Kepa conceded to a last minute header against Manchester United despite a valiant effort to save the ball.

International career

After appearing for Spain's under-18s, Arrizabalaga was called up to the under-19 team for that year's UEFA European Championship. He was the starter during the tournament, as his side were crowned champions; highlights included a 3–3 semi-final success against France, where he saved two penalties in the shootout.

Arrizabalaga missed the 2013 FIFA U-20 World Cup due to injury, being replaced in the tournament squad by Rubén Yáñez. On 8 November 2013 he was called up to the under-21 team, along with Athletic teammate Iker Muniain.

Arrizabalaga was called up to the senior side on 22 March 2017 ahead of a 2018 FIFA World Cup qualifier against Israel and a friendly with France, as a late replacement for the injured Pepe Reina. He earned his first cap on 11 November of that year, playing the full 90 minutes in a 5–0 friendly win over Costa Rica in Málaga.

Arrizabalaga was named in Spain's 23-man squad for the 2018 FIFA World Cup in Russia.

Style of play
As a prospect and young player, Arrizabalaga was regarded as one of the most promising young goalkeepers in Europe, known for his consistency, speed, agility, shot-stopping ability, and quick reflexes, which enables him to produce "brilliant saves." Arrizabalaga was also known for his footwork, distribution, and skill with the ball at his feet, as well as his ability to rush off his line, which allowed him to act as a sweeper keeper and play the ball out of the back in Maurizio Sarri's possession-based system that relied on a high back-line.

Former goalkeeper Manuel Almunia praised Arrizabalaga in 2017 as a goalkeeper with "good, strong feet" and "good movement," who was capable saving the ball with his feet, and also described him as a keeper who possessed "presence and character," also adding: "I'm sure he'll make a great keeper." In 2018, former Athletic Bilbao defender Andoni Goikoetxea described Arrizabalaga as being "good in the air," noting that "he jumps and catches the ball very well," while Richard Fitzpatrick of Bleacher Report described him as being "good at marshalling a defence."

Following a strong start to the first part of his debut season with Chelsea, Arrizabalaga came under criticism for his inconsistency and poor performances, as well as his low save-percentage. He ended the season strongly with a series of excellent performances, in particular en route to his club's Europa League victory.  During his second season with Chelsea, he once again drew criticism over his shot-stopping ability and mistakes, which led him to be dropped by his Chelsea manager Frank Lampard for six matches. Arrizabalaga regained his starting position during the FA Cup tie against Liverpool later in the season. However, following more goalkeeping mistakes he was once again dropped for the final league match of the season and the FA Cup Final. He finished the season with the worst save percentage in Premier League history.

During his re-emergence in subsequent seasons under different managers, he was noted for his good distribution, a skill that would come in handy for English manager Graham Potter in 2022. He has also been praised for his good reflexes and decision making, particularly during a stretch of consecutive clean sheets for Potter.

Career statistics

Club

International

Honours
Chelsea
UEFA Champions League: 2020–21
UEFA Europa League: 2018–19
UEFA Super Cup: 2021
FIFA Club World Cup: 2021
FA Cup runner-up: 2019–20, 2020–21, 2021–22
EFL Cup runner-up: 2018–19, 2021–22

Spain U19
UEFA European Under-19 Championship: 2012

Spain U21
UEFA European Under-21 Championship runner-up: 2017

Individual
UEFA Europa League Squad of the Season: 2018–19
 Premier League Save of the Month: October 2022

References

External links

Profile at the Chelsea F.C. website

1994 births
Living people
People from Ondarroa
Sportspeople from Biscay
Footballers from the Basque Country (autonomous community)
Spanish footballers
Association football goalkeepers
CD Basconia footballers
Bilbao Athletic footballers
SD Ponferradina players
Real Valladolid players
Athletic Bilbao footballers
Chelsea F.C. players
Tercera División players
Segunda División B players
Segunda División players
La Liga players
Premier League players
FA Cup Final players
UEFA Europa League winning players
UEFA Champions League winning players
Spain youth international footballers
Spain under-21 international footballers
Spain international footballers
2018 FIFA World Cup players
Spanish expatriate footballers
Expatriate footballers in England
Spanish expatriate sportspeople in England